Molly-Molly Mandy Stories is the first of six original books in the Milly-Molly-Mandy series written by Joyce Lankester Brisley. It was published in 1928 in both paperback and hardback copies.

The book contains 13 short stories about the life of the title character and her family and friends.

Milly-Molly-Mandy Goes Errands
Milly-Molly-Mandy Spends a Penny
Milly-Molly-Mandy Meets Her Great-Aunt
Milly-Molly-Mandy Goes Blackberrying
Milly-Molly-Mandy Goes to a Party
Milly-Molly-Mandy Enjoys a Visit
Milly-Molly-Mandy Goes Gardening
Milly-Molly-Mandy Makes a Cosy
Milly-Molly-Mandy Keeps Shop
Milly-Molly-Mandy Gives a Party
Milly-Molly-Mandy Goes Visiting
Milly-Molly-Mandy Gets to Know Teacher
Milly-Molly-Mandy Goes to a Fête

Characters

Milly-Molly-Mandy.

Milly-Molly-Mandy's real name is Millicent Margaret Amanda but her family thought it too long a name to call every time they wanted her. She always wears a pink and white striped frock and sometimes a yellow hat. Milly-Molly-Mandy helps by running errands for the family. Milly-Molly-Mandy lives in a nice white cottage with a thatched roof with her large family.

Father

Father's first name is John. Father does all the gardening and grows vegetables for the whole family to eat and sell.

Mother

Mother's first name is Mary but she is called Polly in everyday use. Mother makes all the meals for the family and does all the washing.

Grandpa

Grandpa takes the vegetables to market using his pony (Twinkletoes) and cart.

Grandma

Grandma knits socks, mittens and nice warm woollies for them all. In Milly-Molly-Mandy Spends A Penny, Grandma teaches her to knit a (tea) cosy.

Uncle
 
Uncle's first name is Joe. Uncle keeps cows (to give them all milk) and chickens (to give them all eggs).

Aunty

Aunty sews frocks and shirts for them all and does the sweeping and dusting. Aunty's first name is Alice.

Great Aunt Margaret

Great Aunt Margaret is Grandma's sister and came to stay for a few days.

Topsy

Topsy is Milly-Molly-Mandy's black and white cat.

Toby

Toby is Milly-Molly-Mandy's small black and white terrier.

Duckling

In the story Milly-Molly-Mandy spends a penny she saves up three pennies and buys a duckling.

Little Friend Susan
 
Susan Moggs is Milly-Molly-Mandy's best friend. She lives with her mother and father and little sister Doris in a cottage near Milly-Molly-Mandy's.

Doris Moggs

Doris is Little Friend Susan's baby sister. Milly-Molly-Mandy helps look for a name for her and decides on Primrose but Mrs Moggs had already named her Doris. Milly-Molly-Mandy gets locked in her bedroom by accident and spends the whole day crocheting Doris a bonnet.

Billy Blunt

Billy Blunt is another friend of Milly-Molly-Mandy's. Milly-Molly-Mandy, Susan, and Billy often go around playing together. Billy Blunt lives with his mother and father who own a corn shop in the village.

Jilly

Jilly Muggins is another friend to Milly-Molly-Mandy. She lives with her Aunty, Miss Muggins, who owns a shop that sells sweets and material and other useful things that everybody in the village needs.

Bunchy

Bunchy's real name is Violet Rosemary May. In one story Milly-Molly-Mandy rips her dress while playing with Toby so Mother and Milly-Molly-Mandy go out to buy some new material. This is where they meet Bunchy also buying material for a new dress. Unfortunately, there are only two types of suitable dressmaking material: one is Milly-Molly-Mandy's pink and white stripes and the other is a pattern of daisies and forget-me-nots. Both girls want it but there is only enough for one dress, so Milly-Molly-Mandy decides Bunchy should have it because of her name and the two become friends.

Mr Rudge

Mr Rudge is a blacksmith who Milly-Molly-Mandy invited to their party and then later in the last book he gets married and Milly-Molly-Mandy and Little Friend Susan are the bridesmaids.

Miss Edwards

Miss Edwards is a teacher at Milly-Molly-Mandy's school. In one of the stories Miss Sheppard the headmistress went away and Miss Edwards becomes the headteacher. She moves into the school cottage. Because she was moving from the town into the cottage, Miss Edwards writes to Milly-Molly-Mandy's mother to ask if she might stay for a few days while she gets the cottage sorted out. Mother agrees to this so Milly-Molly-Mandy is worried that she will have to be on her best behavior. In fact, teacher turns out to be completely a different person away from school; Billy Blunt and Little Friend Susan wish that she had come to their houses.

Milly-Molly-Mandy's world is a souvenir of the not-so-distant, ancient cultures of rural England.  Beyond the interaction of people with people, there is an interaction of people and animals with nature. She grew up in the countryside, and her experiences reflect this.  She and her cat acknowledge the summer solstice, she acknowledges Mayday, and there are numerous references to nature in the context of a people who relied on the seasons.

External links
 Gusworld. The Milly-Molly-Mandy Guide

1928 short story collections
Children's short story collections
1928 children's books
British children's books